Matthew McManus is an American television writer and filmmaker. He is known for writing and directing the 2012 South By Southwest official selection Funeral Kings, as well as the 2021 film The Block Island Sound.

He is also known for writing and producing episodes of the Netflix series Cobra Kai and American Vandal. For his work on American Vandal, McManus was nominated for an Emmy Award for Outstanding Writing in a Limited Series or TV Movie and won a Peabody Award.

Career 
McManus's first feature film, Funeral Kings premiered in March 2012 at the South By Southwest Film Festival. He then went on to produce the horror feature film 13 Cameras which earned a New York Times Critic's Pick.

Most recently, McManus wrote, produced and directed the film The Block Island Sound which was released on Netflix in March 2021 where it hit the Top Ten films within its first week on the platform.

American Vandal 
McManus was a writer and producer on both Season 1 and Season 2 of American Vandal. The series was Netflix's most binge-watched show of 2017. On April 19, 2018, American Vandal won a 2017 Peabody Award for Entertainment. In July 2018, it was nominated for a Primetime Emmy Award.

Select filmography

References 

American filmmakers
American television writers
Year of birth missing (living people)
Living people